Oto-Awori previously known as just "OTO" is a suburban community and a local government development council area located along the Lagos-Badagry Expressway in Ojo local government area of Lagos State. Oto Awori is founded by Ayato which is the predecessor for Today's Esau Oladega AINA (Kuyamiku) of the Oloja Ruling House of Oto Awori. Ayato the founder of Oto Awori from Ile-Ife, Oto Awori has been administered from Badagry since 1909 having apparently been placed for a few years in the Lagos District by the definition of boundaries thereof 1985.

Higher institutions
Adeniran Ogunsanya College of Education
National Postgraduate College of Nigeria

See also
 History of Lagos
 Awori District settlements

References

Populated places in Lagos State